The 1924 United States presidential election in Missouri took place on November 4, 1924 as part of the 1924 United States presidential election. Voters chose 18 representatives, or electors to the Electoral College, who voted for president and vice president.

Calvin Coolidge narrowly won Missouri by 5.79 points against John W. Davis, winning all 18 of the electoral votes in the state. To date, this is the last time that the city of St. Louis voted for the Republican candidate in a presidential election.

Results

Results by county

See also
 United States presidential elections in Missouri

Notes

References

Missouri
1924
1924 Missouri elections